Asadabad-e Sofla may refer to:
 Asadabad-e Sofla, Ilam
 Asadabad-e Sofla, Lorestan
 Asadabad-e Sofla, Firuzabad, Lorestan Province
 Asadabad-e Sofla, Yazd